José Antonio Durán Rivas (born 27 June 1974) is a Spanish football manager and former player.

Career
Born in Lugo, Galicia, Durán started his managerial career at the youth levels of hometown's CD Lugo, club he already represented as a player. In 2004, he was appointed manager of the first team in Tercera División, replacing fired Quique Prado, and managed to achieve 10 wins in 18 matches as his side missed out promotion by finishing sixth.

On 10 January 2006, Durán was appointed at the helm of CD Foz in the fifth level, and managed to finish 16th. On 26 June, however, he resigned after his side was relegated.

On 1 June 2007, Durán was named Viveiro CF manager. He was sacked on 4 June of the following year, and returned to his previous club Foz on 11 July.

On 21 June 2010, after narrowly missing out promotion to the fourth tier in his first campaign and finishing in a comfortable mid-table position in his second, Durán announced his resignment. He subsequently returned to Lugo and its youth setup, being a manager of the Juvenil squad.

On 25 February 2016, Durán was named manager of the Albivermellos, as a replacement to Luis Milla, until the end of the season. His first professional match in charge occurred three days later, a 3–1 Segunda División away loss against Real Zaragoza.

Despite losing his first match in charge, Durán achieved three wins and one draw during the month of March, which ensured him the Segunda División Manager of the Month award. He was relieved from his duties on 11 June 2016, after avoiding relegation, and was appointed in charge of the farm team SDC Polvorín shortly after.

On 31 July 2020, after taking the reserve side to the fourth division, Durán left Polvorín. On 17 October 2021, he moved abroad for the first time in his career to take over Belgian Third Division side K. Rupel Boom F.C., but was fired on 25 November.

Managerial statistics

References

External links

1975 births
Living people
Spanish footballers
Footballers from Lugo
Association footballers not categorized by position
CD Lugo players
Spanish football managers
Segunda División managers
Tercera División managers
CD Lugo managers
Spanish expatriate football managers
Spanish expatriate sportspeople in Belgium
Expatriate football managers in Belgium